Pascual Cucala (1822 – January 31, 1892) was a Spanish Valencian carlist. He was born in the Province of Castellón in Valencia. He fought against the army of the First Spanish Republic on behalf of Carlos, Duke of Madrid. After the defeat of the carlists in 1876, he went into exile in France, where he died.

References
n/a

Further reading
 Urcelay, Javier (2002). El Maestrazgo carlista (2nd Edition). (in Catalan) Vinaròs: Editorial Antinea. 

1822 births
1892 deaths
Carlists
19th-century Spanish military personnel
People of the Third Carlist War